Stepan Zhdanov (born August 25, 1989) is a professional ice hockey player. He played 13 games of the 2009–10 season with Metallurg Novokuznetsk of the Kontinental Hockey League.

References

External links

1989 births
Living people
Metallurg Novokuznetsk players
Russian ice hockey forwards
People from Novokuznetsk
Sportspeople from Kemerovo Oblast